Gerard Francis D'Mello (born 25 February 1986) is an Indian footballer who plays as a goalkeeper for Sporting Clube de Goa in the I-League.

Career statistics

Club
Statistics accurate as of 11 May 2013

References

Indian footballers
1986 births
Living people
I-League players
Sporting Clube de Goa players
Association football goalkeepers
Footballers from Goa